Allobaccha is a genus of hoverfly with a large number of species. It was originally created as a subgenus of Baccha. Many species have an elongated wasp like abdomen and adults as well as larvae are predators of soft-bodied Hemiptera.

Species
Species in the genus include:
A. atra (Van Doesburg, 1959)
A. basalis (Walker, 1861)
A. bequaerti (Curran, 1929)
A. denhoedi (Van Doesburg, 1959)
A. flavipes (Van Doesburg, 1959)
A. fumosa Dirickx, 2010
A. inversa (Curran, 1929)
A. liberia (Curran, 1929)
A. loriae (De Meijere, 1908)
A. macgregori (Curran, 1929)
A. madecassa Dirickx, 2010
A. mundula (Van der Wulp, 1898)
A. nigroscutata (Enderlein, 1938)
A. nitidithorax (Curran, 1929)
A. obscura Dirickx, 2010
A. purpuricola (Walker, 1859)
A. rubella (Van der Wulp, 1898)
A. sapphirina (Wiedemann, 1830)
A. similis Dirickx, 2010
A. subflava Dirickx, 2010
A. pallida (De Meijere, 1908)

Allobaccha picta (Wiedemann, 1830) is a synonym of Copestylum pictum (Wiedemann, 1830).

References

External links
 http://www.papua-insects.nl/insect%20orders/Diptera/Syrphoidea/Syrphoidea.htm

Syrphini
Diptera of Asia
Diptera of Australasia
Diptera of Africa
Hoverfly genera
Taxa named by Charles Howard Curran